List of events held in the Syracuse, New York metropolitan area on an annual basis, by type.

Art fairs, shows, and galleries
 Art on the Porches (Ruskin Ave, Strathmore Neighborhood, Syracuse)
 Syracuse Arts and Crafts Festival
 Festival of Trees (Everson Museum)
 Gingerbread Gallery (Erie Canal Museum)
 Austn Park Annual Art & Craft show/sale, Skaneateles

Ethnic festivals
 Bavarianfest
 CNY Scottish Games & Celtic Festival
 New York India Festival 
 CNY Scottish Games
 Euro Fest
 George W. Fowler High School Muticultural Festival
 Greek Cultural Festival
 Irish Festival
 Italian Festival (La Festa Italiana)
 Jewish Music & Cultural Festival
 Latin American Festival
 Middle Eastern Cultural Festival
 Oktoberfest
 Polish Festival
 Southeast Asian Festival
 St. George Macedonian Ethnic Festival
 St. John the Baptist Ukrainian Festival
 St. Patrick's Irish Festival & Street Fair
 St. Sophia's Greek Festival
 Westcott Street Cultural Fair

Film
 Syracuse International Film Festival

Food
 Brew At The Zoo (Rosamond Gifford Zoo)
 Chicken Wing Festival
 Strawberry Festival
 Taste of Syracuse
 Tomatofest
 Central New York Brewfest
 Empire Brewfest

Historical
 Canal Day

Holiday related
 First Night
 Juneteenth celebration  
 Syracuse St. Patrick's Parade   
 Autumn Equinox Festival 
 Thanksgiving Day Parade
 Veterans Day Ceremony & Parade
 The Great Zoo Boo

Music
 Syracuse Jazz Festival
 CNY Bluegrass Association Festival
 Empire State Brewing and Music Festival
 CNY JazzFest
 Jazz in the Square
 New York State Blues Festival
 Party in the Plaza concert series
 Syracuse Area Music Awards
 World in the Square

Parades, processions, walks, and marches
 CNY 
 CNY Society for the Prevention of Cruelty to Animals Walk
 Hiroshima/Nagasaki Procession
 Syracuse St. Patrick's Parade

Performing arts
 Syracuse International Arts & Puppet Festival
 Shakespeare-in-the-Park

Races and competitions
 Human Dogsled Race
 
 Parks Run 4 Mile Race: Onondaga Park in Syracuse's Strathmore Neighborhood
 Syracuse Festival of Races 
 Syrathon 
 Syracuse Half Marathon

Regional fairs and festivals
 Great New York State Fair (late August to Labor day)
 Skaneateles Festival
 Solvay Summer Festival
 Armed Forces Day, held in conjunction with a Syracuse Chiefs Baseball game
 Super DIRT Week

Unsorted
 Apple Festival
 Balloon Fest
 Harborfest
 Lights on the Lake
 Rose Day
 Salt City Comic-Con
 Parade of Homes
 Art on Parade
 Syracuse Nationals
 Syracuse Winterfest

Events
Syracuse
Events
Events in New York (state)
Annual events
Syracuse